Georges Poisson (27 November 1924 – 14 May 2022) was a French art historian.

Poisson was born in Düsseldorf on 27 November 1924. A nephew of demographer Alfred Sauvy, and journalist , Georges Poisson was the son of journalist Claude Salvy (Marie-Madeleine Sauvy).

At the same time, he carried out reorganization missions to the museums of Meudon (where the organization of the rooms was rethought,), Courbevoie, Dourdan, Blaye, etc. He was the initiator of the gift of bibliophile André Desguines's library to the department of Hauts-de-Seine.

Poisson died on 14 May 2022, at the age of 97.

Publications 

1945: Normandie, terre meurtrie, Paris, Compagnie des Arts Photomécaniques, 1945
1950: Les musées de France, Presses Universitaires de France, series "Que sais-je?", 1950
1951: Sceaux, histoire et guide, Paris, Éd. L'Indispensable, 1951
1951: Guide du Touriste Lettré, in collaboration with Pierre d'Espezel, Curnonsky,  etc., Paris, Éd. Ch. Poisson
1952: Paris et ses environs, in collaboration with René Mathieu, preface by Jules Romains, Éd. Nagel
1952: La vie parisienne vue par les peintres, Paris, Éd. Nathan
1954: Urbanisme et architecture, in collaboration, [mélanges publiés en l'honneur du professeur Lavedan], Paris, Éd. Laurens
1955: Lisieux et le pays d'Auge, in collaboration with Patrice Boussel, Paris, Éditions du Centurion, series "Plaisir du voyage"
1955: La femme dans la peinture moderne, Paris, Plon
1955: Les environs de Paris, Paris, Éd. Hachette, series "Guides Bleus"
1956: Évocation du Grand Paris, volume I, "La banlieue sud" Paris, Éditions de Minuit
Kléber-Colombes
1958: Fontaines de Paris, Éditions du Centurion
1958: Les peintres du rêve, Plon
1958: Le Val de Marne,
 La Principauté de Monaco, Éditions du Centurion
1960: Évocation du Grand Paris, volume II, "La banlieue Nord-Ouest", Éd. de Minuit
1962: Histoire souriante de Paris, Éd. Berger et Levrault
1963: Les Châteaux de la Loire, Éd. Larousse
1964: Napoléon et Paris
1965: Moyen Âge en Ile-de-France, Fayard
1965: Pays du dimanche : Ile-de-France, 2 Sud, Éd. Arts et Métiers graphiques
Hachette
1967: Histoire du Val d’Oise, supplement to n° 5 of Bulletin d'Information de la Préfecture de Val d'Oise
1967: Promenades aux Châteaux de l’Ile-de-France, Éd. André Balland
1968: Le Val de Marne, Art et Histoire, Éd. de Minuit, (prix Toutain 1968 ; prix de l'Académie française).
1969: Saint-Simon, Album de la Pléiade, bibliothèque de la Pléiade, éditions Gallimard
1973: De Maisons-sur-Seine à Maisons-Laffitte
1976: Les musées de France, PUF, series "Que sais-je"
1977: Cette curieuse famille d’Orléans
1977: Donation André Dunoyer de Segonzac (1965), in collaboration with Maddy Ariès
1980: Histoire des grands boulevards, (prix de l’Académie française)
1981: Histoire et histoires de Sceaux, preface by Georges Duhamel
1981: À la recherche des châteaux perdus, preface by Duchess de La Rochefoucauld
1982: Charenton-le-Pont, 5000 ans d’histoire, preface by 
1983: Dix siècles à Montfort l’Amaury, in collaboration with M.H. Hadrot, preface by Jacques de Lacretelle, (prix Georges Goyau ; prix de l’Académie française).
1984: L’Essonne dans la Seine-et-Oise d’autrefois
1985: Les Hauts-de-Seine, 60 ans avant leur naissance
1986: Choderlos de Laclos ou l'obstination, Éd. Grasset et Fasquelle, (prix Goncourt de la biographie)
1986: Le duc de Saint-Simon (seigneur de La Ferté-Vidame) et le Perche, Éd. des 
1987: La curieuse histoire du Vésinet, preface by Alain Decaux
1987: Monsieur de Saint-Simon, (Henry Malherbe Prize)
1987: Monte-Cristo, un château de roman, preface by Alain Decaux, Éd. Champflour, 122 p. 
1988: L’Élysée, histoire d’un palais (de la marquise de Pompadour à Valéry Giscard d’Estaing), (prix Biguet ; prix de l’Académie française).
1989: Paris au temps de la Révolution
1990: Guide des statues de Paris, Éd. Hazan
1991: Guide des maisons d’Hommes célèbres
1992: Histoire de Saint-Maurice
1993: Rueil-Malmaison, quinze siècles d’histoire
1993: Les Chemins du Roi Soleil
1997: Histoire de l’architecture à Paris
1998: La Ferté-Vidame, in collaboration with François Dugas du Villard, Michel Lallemand, Gérard Mabille and Philippe Siguret, Éd. des Amis du Perche
1999: Histoire de l’Élysée, de Madame de Pompadour à Jacques Chirac, Éd. Perrin, 
1999: La duchesse de Chevreuse, Éd. Perrin, .
1999: Dictionnaire des Monuments d’Ile-de-France, preface by Jean-Paul Huchon, Éd. Hervas, (prix des Vieilles Maisons Françaises)
2001: Maintenon, Éd. Norma
2002: Les Grands Travaux des Présidents de la Ve République : de Charles de Gaulle à Jacques Chirac, Éd. Parigramme, 2002, 196 p. 
2002: Napoléon Ier et Paris, l'empereur architecte, Éd. Tallandier, Bibliothèque Napoléonienne, 
2003: "Les soirées de Médan", Cahiers Rouges n°129 [Zola-Maupassant-Huysmans], preface by Georges Poisson and Léon Hennique, Éditions Grasset
2004: Retour des cendres de Napoléon, preface by Jean Tulard, Éd. Tallandier
2006: Retour des cendres de l’Aiglon, Éd. du Nouveau Monde, 
2006: Les secrets de l'Élysée, Éd. Timé, col. "Les plus belles histoires", 
2007: Sacha Guitry entre en scène, Éd. Timé, col. "Les plus belles histoires", 
2007: Monsieur de Saint-Simon, Éd. Nouveau Monde, 
2009: Combats pour le Patrimoine, Éd. Pygmalion, 
2009: Saint-Simon, Sceaux et l’Ile-de-France, preface by Philippe Hourcade, Société Saint-Simon
2009: Le Comte de Chambord, Éd. Pygmalion, 
2010: L’Élysée : histoire d'un palais des origines à Sarkozy, Éd. Pygmalion, 
2013: La Grande histoire du Louvre, Éd. Perrin, col. "Synthèses Économiques",  
2014: Tel était Molière, Actes Sud-Papiers,

Honours and titles 
 Commandeur de la Légion d'honneur
 Commandeur of the Ordre des Arts et des Lettres
 Great medal of art history of the Académie d'architecture
 honoris causa doctor of Sōka University at Tokyo
 Honorary President, co-founder of the Société Saint-Simon

References

External links 
 Jean-François Suzanne, Hommage à Michel Fleury : une journée émouvante , sur le site des Amis du Perche, avec le partenariat de la ville de Mortagne-au-Perche et de l'association de sauvegarde de l'église de Loisé
 Interview de Georges Poisson à propos des maisons d'écrivains on linternaute.com

1924 births
2022 deaths
20th-century French historians
21st-century French historians
French biographers
Cultural historians
Directors of museums in France
Lycée Louis-le-Grand alumni
Commandeurs of the Légion d'honneur
Commandeurs of the Ordre des Arts et des Lettres
Prix Goncourt de la Biographie winners
Writers from Düsseldorf